Businesses owned by Dalit people in India exist but opportunities for development of such enterprises have been hampered by historic attitudes towards the community. Ongoing emancipation and political assertion permitted some of the Dalits to succeed in Indian society.

According to a national economic survey in 2005, Dalits constituted 16.4% of the population and operated 9.8% of business enterprises, most of which were small. Only few thousand are significant businesspersons.

See also
 Dalit Indian Chamber of Commerce and Industry

Notes

Economy of India
Economic history
Dalit people
Indian businesspeople